Dhumm is a 2002 Indian Kannada action drama film directed by M. S. Ramesh, starring Sudeep and Rakshita. The film features background score and soundtrack composed by Gurukiran and lyrics by Kaviraj and V. Nagendra Prasad. The film released on 27 September 2002. It was a critical and commercial success. The film was dubbed in Telugu as Hero No.1 and in Hindi as Dumdaar. The film is a remake of the Tamil film Dheena (2001) by A. R. Murugadoss.

Plot

The protagonist Varada (Sudeep) is like a fire when the injustice comes in front of him. His heart is equivalent to ice cream otherwise. He picks up the ‘long’ on a solid reason and continues his vengeance when required. His mother is against to Varada's firing principles but Varada thinks he is only the bad element in the house and never gives up his ideals. But the inner heart of Varada is also struggling to get good name and this is established in the climax.

The fiery handsome guy in love with his opponent's daughter (Rakshita) reaches a tight spot when his sister is murdered. He hatches a nice plot and fulfills his task of retaining the glory of his father. He only begs with his mother to accept him as a good son after setting the goons on the ground.

Cast
 Sudeep as Varada
 Rakshita as Preethi
 Srinath as Varada and Shankar's father
 Sumithra as Varada and Shankar's mother
 Nassar as Shankar
 Rangayana Raghu as M.L.A.
 Arun Sagar as Vinod (Preethi's brother)
 Sadhu Kokila as Varada's friend
 Chitra Shenoy as Preethi's sister

Reception
Chitraloka wrote that "This is an action extravaganza. M.S.Ramesh has really showed his ‘guts’ in making a nice action film that stands out from other action films. The dialogues and wonderful performance by key artistes has boosted up the quality of the film. [...] Congrats for the convincing job done by Ramesh and Team".

Soundtrack

Awards

Filmfare Awards South :-
 Best Music Director – Kannada(2002) - Gurukiran

References

External links
 

2002 films
2000s Kannada-language films
Films scored by Gurukiran
Indian action drama films
Kannada remakes of Tamil films
2000s masala films
Indian gangster films
2002 action films